Kennard Independent School District is a public school district based in Kennard, Texas, United States.  It has two campuses - Kennard High School (grades 7-12) and Kennard Elementary School (kindergarten-grade 6). It is mostly located in Houston County, and a small portion goes into Trinity County.

In 2009, the school district was rated "academically acceptable" by the Texas Education Agency.

References

External links
Kennard ISD

School districts in Houston County, Texas
School districts in Trinity County, Texas